The following highways are numbered 782:

United States